The London and North Western Railway (LNWR) Renown Class was a class of 4-4-0 steam locomotives.  They were rebuilds of F.W. Webb's 4-cylinder compounds of the Jubilee and Alfred the Great classes into 2-cylinder simple engines by George Whale, later continued by Charles Bowen-Cooke.

The first to be rebuilt was number 1918 Renown in 1908.

The rebuilds retained their original numbers.  Unusually for the LNWR, the parent classes also had logical number series.  Thus the Renowns were all numbered in the 1901–1940 series for ex-Jubilee Class and 1941–1980 for ex-Benbow class.  In 1920, locomotive 1914 Invincible was renumbered 1257, and the number 1914 was then taken by the Claughton Class war memorial engine 1914 Patriot.

The London, Midland and Scottish Railway (LMS) acquired 56 Renowns in 1923.  The LMS allocated these numbers in the 5131–5186 series, listed according to date of rebuilding, though not all numbers were applied before withdrawals started in 1928.  Meanwhile, the LMS renumbered the existing compounds into the 5110–5129 series (though some were withdrawn before numbers could be allocated, and others were allocated numbers but not applied), and converted another 14 of these, which retained their numbers, thus taking the total for the class up to 70.  All were gone by 1931 and none was preserved.

Accidents and incidents

On 14 August 1915, a locomotive hauling a passenger train suffered a mechanical defect which resulted in track being damaged at weedon, Northamptonshire. Locomotive No. 1971 Aurora was one of two hauling a mail train that was derailed on the damaged track. Ten people were killed and 21 were injured.

Locomotive list

References

Renown
4-4-0 locomotives
Railway locomotives introduced in 1908
Standard gauge steam locomotives of Great Britain
Scrapped locomotives